Noordung may refer to:
 Herman Noordung, pseudonym of Herman Potočnik (1892–1929), Austro-Hungarian rocket engineer and pioneer of cosmonautics
 Noordung (NSK), a Slovene theater group associated with Neue Slowenische Kunst